Before This World is the nineteenth studio album by American singer-songwriter James Taylor. Released on June 15, 2015, it was Taylor's first new studio album of original material since October Road (2002) and first studio album of any kind since Covers in 2008.  He recorded the album in a barn on his property in western Massachusetts with Steve Gadd on drums and Jimmy Johnson on bass. In April 2015, he announced a short U.S. tour running from July 2 to August 6 to promote the album, which then continued into 2016 and 2017.

Before This World became Taylor's first album to reach number one on the Billboard 200 chart. The album arrived on top of the chart of July 4, 2015, more than 45 years after Taylor arrived on the list with Sweet Baby James (on the March 14, 1970, list). The album launched atop the Billboard 200 with 97,000 equivalent album units earned in the week ending June 21, 2015. Of its start, pure album sales were 96,000 copies sold, Taylor's best debut week for an album since October Road.

Background
James Taylor's previous original album, October Road, was released in 2002, following which Taylor did not prioritize writing new material for many years. Concerned he might never create another original album, Taylor convinced family, friends, and manager he needed to cut off all communication and lived alone in a waterfront apartment in Newport, Rhode Island while composing the album.

Lyrics from a song on Taylor's 1981 album, Dad Loves His Work, appear in the title of the opening track:

Recording
Basic tracks were recorded at The Barn in Massachusetts during ten days in January 2014. This was followed by some dubbing of backup vocals at Ocean Way in Los Angeles during March 2014.

Live performance
On his 2014 All Star Band tour, Taylor performed several tracks from the album prior to its release. "Today Today Today", "You And I Again" and "Stretch of the Highway" were debuted at the May 30, 2014, show and played throughout the tour; the traditional song "Wild Mountain Thyme" also earned a regular place in the shows (it had been previously performed by James Taylor occasionally in concert). At Toronto's show on July 24, 2014, James Taylor performed "SnowTime" specially and explained that the song was written about Toronto. "Angels of Fenway", "Montana" and "Before This World / Jolly Springtime" were all performed during his shows in his spring and summer tour of 2015, to coincide with the album's release.

Commercial performance
Before This World debuted at number one with 97,000 units moved on the week ending June 21, becoming Taylor's first number-one album on the US Billboard 200 chart. This made Taylor surpass Black Sabbath to become the second-longest waiting artist for a number-one album – 47 years since James Taylor (1968) — behind a 54-year wait by Tony Bennett. Also, he had scored 11 Top 10 albums before achieving his first No. 1, just behind Neil Diamond. The following week, the album came in at No. 5, selling 50,000 copies in its second week.

On the UK Albums Chart, the album started at number 4 with 13,801 copies on sales, became Taylor's fourth top 10 albums. It also tied with The Best of James Taylor (2003) for his highest-ranking album on chart, while both are peaked at number four.

Track listings
All tracks written by James Taylor, except as noted.

Personnel 
All songs feature James Taylor's All Star Band. 

 James Taylor – vocals, acoustic guitars, hi-strung guitar, guitar synthesizer, harmonica, arrangements (10)
 Larry Goldings – acoustic piano, Fender Rhodes, Wurlitzer electric piano, organ, accordion, harmonium
 Michael Landau – electric guitars, nylon-string guitar
 Jimmy Johnson – bass 
 Steve Gadd – drums 
 Luis Conte – percussion 
 Walt Fowler – handclaps (6)
 Andrea Zonn – fiddle, vocals
 Rajendra Prasanna – shehnai (9)
 David Lasley – vocals 
 Kate Markowitz – vocals 
 Arnold McCuller – vocals 
 Caroline Taylor – vocals (3, 10)
 Henry Taylor – vocals (3, 10)
 Sting – vocals (8)
Brass, Horns and Strings
 Rob Mounsey – all arrangements and conductor, cello arrangements (2, 8)
 Andy Snitzer – brass and horn coordinator (4)
 JoAnn Tominaga – string contractor (7)
 Antoine Silverman – concertmaster (7)
 Michael Davis – euphonium (2), trombone (4)
 Tony Kadleck – flugelhorn (2)
 Larry Di Bello and David Peel French horn (2)
 Roger Rosenberg – baritone saxophone (4)
 Lou Marini and Dave Mann – tenor saxophone (4)
 Randy Andos – trombone (4)
 Randy Brecker, Barry Danielian and Walt Fowler – trumpet (4)
 Yo-Yo Ma – cello (2, 8)
 Emily Brause and Peter Sachon – cello (7)
 Katharine Kresek and Philip Payton – viola (7)
  Jonathan Dinklage, Rachel Golub, Hiroko Taguchi, Entcho Todorov and Orlando Wells – violin (7)

Production 
 Dave O'Donnell – producer, recording, mixing 
 Rick Kwan – additional engineer 
 Tyler Hartman, Tommy Joyner, Fernando Lodeiro, Scott Moore, Justin Rose and Jay Zubricky – assistant engineers
 Ted Jensen – mastering at Sterling Sound (New York, NY)
 Matthew Agoglia and Justin Shturtz – mastering assistants
 JoAnn Tominaga – production coordinator 
 Ellyn Kusmin – senior production coordinator, additional photography
 Kevin Reagan – art direction, design
 Timothy White – photography 
 James O'Mara, Daniel Stephens and Spencer Worthley – additional photography

Production
Dave O'Donnell – producer
Ted Jensen at Sterling Sound, NYC – mastering

Charts

Weekly charts

Year-end charts

Release history

References

External links
 

James Taylor albums
2015 albums
Albums recorded in a home studio
Albums recorded at United Western Recorders